USS General Putnam (SP-2284) was a ferry boat acquired by the U.S. Navy for local service for a short period of time during World War I.  She was returned to her owner at the close of the war.

Construction
General Putnam (SP-2284), a ferry boat, was built in 1902 by Pusey & Jones, Wilmington, Delaware. She was propelled by a  steam engine, which had one shaft.

Service history 
She was assigned to the 3d Naval District. General Putnam was manned by the owner's civilian crew and was used as a ferry boat between New York Navy Yard and Ellis Island. After the Armistice, she was returned to her owner on 2 October 1919.

References

Ships built by Pusey and Jones
1902 ships
Ferries of the United States Navy
World War I auxiliary ships of the United States